Dabbing, or the dab, is a gesture in which a person drops their head into the bent crook of a slanted, upward angled arm, while raising the opposite arm out straight in a parallel direction. It appears to be similar to someone sneezing into the crook of their elbow. Since 2015, dabbing has been used as a gesture of triumph or playfulness, becoming a youthful fad and Internet meme.

Origins 

Before the term "dab" was coined, the move had been a feature of Japanese popular culture for decades. A popular example is the 1990s anime series Dragon Ball Z, where the character Gohan (as The Great Saiyaman) occasionally performs the dab move.
It is known as a "Sentai move" in Japan, from its popular use in the Super Sentai and Kamen Rider tokusatsu superhero series since the 1970s (localised as Power Rangers and Masked Rider in the 1990s). 
It resurfaced again in 1993, seen in one of Janet Jackson's dance videos for the song "If", which also had strong Asian influences. In the 1990s show Detective Conans 2000 opening theme "Koi wa Thrill, Shock, Suspense", the main character was shown dancing while occasionally dabbing. This opening was then remade 20 years later in Opening 51 with the same character doing a few dabs when the music starts. Other anime series where the dab move appears include the early 2010s show Love Live!, among others.
The K-pop group Crayon Pop also appear to have performed the dab dance in the early 2010s, and so does the American dance crew Poreotics in 2010.

During a performance at the Paramount Theater in Springfield, Massachusetts in early 2014, rap group Migos performed the dance move, and the dab gained popularity in mid-2014. The dab was introduced to Migos and their Quality Control Music label by Peter Thomson. Musicians on label had claimed the dab was invented by rapper Skippa Da Flippa and had origins in the Atlanta hip-hop scene in the 2010s.  Another rap group on that label, Migos, who released a single in 2015 titled "Look at My Dab," had claimed to have invented the move,
but they later agreed that Skippa Da Flippa was the inventor after criticism from a third member of that label, OG Maco.
The English language  audio dub of the Japanese anime series Yu-Gi-Oh! VRAINS (2017) adds a joke referring to a Sentai move as "the dab".

American rapper Bow Wow attempted to explain the origin of the dab dance, saying it derived from the cannabis dabbers community, which started in about 2012, before the dance move. He was met with opposition from other rappers who immediately took to Twitter to insult him and disprove his claims. The rappers Peewee Longway, Jose Guapo and Rich the Kid contributed to popularizing the dab dance.

A slight variation of the dance move also appears several times in the music video for Michael Jackson's "Smooth Criminal" from 1988.

This dance move also appears in the music video for Boyz II Men's "Can't Let Her Go" in 1997.

Rihanna performs a slight variation of the move in her song Only Girl (In the World).

An Indian dance includes a wingtip-hand version of dabbing; Bollywood choreographers can be seen performing the move in the song Tamma Tamma Loge.

Popularity
As XXL magazine reported in August 2015, "What started as a regional down South adlib is quickly becoming a masterful maneuver in clubs and on street corners. It’s called dabbin’." Jason Derulo taught James Corden how to dab during the November 4, 2015 edition of "Carpool Karaoke" on The Late Late Show with James Corden.

The dab gained popularity in American sports following an eight-second celebratory dab by Cam Newton, football quarterback for the Carolina Panthers of the National Football League, during a game against the Tennessee Titans on November 15, 2015. According to a Sports Illustrated account of the incident, "[w]hen two Titans players confronted [Newton] about the celebration, he continued to dance in their faces, even as he backed away." Newton explained the incident by crediting a 16-year-old for instructing him to "Dab on them folks":

I'm a firm believer that if you don't like me to do it then don't let me in ... I just like doing it, man. It's not to be boastful, and from the crowd's response they like seeing it. ... Tell me what to do "Dab on them folks," so I tried "Dab on them folks," in that tone too. "Dab on them folks." He's only like 16, but he's got an Adam's apple out of this world.

It was later confirmed that the 16-year-old was Newton's younger brother Caylin. On June 9, 2016, Cam Newton announced that he would no longer perform the celebration. However, he dabbed again on November 13, 2016 after a touchdown against the Kansas City Chiefs, nearly a year after his initial dab against the Titans.

Dabbing has made its appearance in politics, as well. In January 2016, Democratic presidential candidate Hillary Clinton dabbed on The Ellen DeGeneres Show. In October 2016, Congresswoman Loretta Sanchez dabbed at the end of a Senate debate against Attorney General Kamala Harris. On January 3, 2017, Cal Marshall, 17-year-old son of Rep. Roger Marshall (R-Kan), dabbed at his father's swearing in as a Congressman, confusing House Speaker Paul Ryan. On February 22, 2017, Deputy Labour Leader Tom Watson dabbed in the UK's House of Commons. French presidential candidates Emmanuel Macron, Benoît Hamon and François Fillon dabbed on TV in March 2017. In May 2017, Prince Sverre Magnus of Norway dabbed at the Royal Palace in Oslo during his grandparents' King Harald V and Queen Sonja's official appearance for their 80th birthday. In October 2017, Australian Labor Party leader Bill Shorten dabbed as part of a "diss track" criticising members of the Liberal Party. He later alluded to the dab's infamy, stating that his children had been "humiliated" by it.

In January 2017, an Australian cricketer Usman Khawaja dabbed in celebration of his half-century score in a Test match against Pakistan in Sydney. His move received mixed reactions, with some praising it and others accusing him of disrespecting his opponents.

In February 2017, the president of Kenya, Uhuru Kenyatta, invited a dance group to State House to perform the dab dance move with him. The president was doing the dab dance in a bid to appeal to the youthful population of Kenya to come out and register as voters. Some critics found this move to be in bad taste since there were other pressing issues like the doctors and lecturers strike that the president should have been dealing with rather than dancing.

Today, the dab is both a dance move and a statement. The culture behind it has been propagated by celebrity use and memes. Many dancers incorporate the move in their repertoire as a minor addition to a set; a dab is usually used to mark a drop. In addition, the dance move has become notorious around the world and has gained the significant attraction and attention from media in many countries.

Manchester United footballers Paul Pogba and Jesse Lingard also popularised the dab by performing the dance as their goal celebration. Wrestler T. J. Perkins often uses the move as a taunt or a sign of disrespect after a headstand headscissors takedown.

Illegality in Saudi Arabia
In Saudi Arabia, dabbing was made illegal by the National Committee for Drug Control as it was deemed that it alludes to cannabis and other illegal substances. In August 2017, Saudi singer and actor Abdallah Al Shaharani was arrested for performing the move at a music festival in Ta'if, and afterward apologized in a tweet.

See also
Quenelle (gesture)
Hit dem folks
Nae Nae
Twerk

References

External links

Street dance
Novelty and fad dances
2010s fads and trends
Hip hop dance
Internet memes introduced in 2015
Dance moves
Gestures